The Shire of Euroa was a local government area about  northeast of Melbourne, the state capital of Victoria, Australia.

History

Euroa was originally within the Shire of Benalla (1868), and was severed and incorporated on 3 November 1879, as the Shire of Euroa. It lost parts of several ridings when the Shire of Violet Town was created on 11 April 1895, and part of its North Riding was annexed to the Shire of Shepparton on 24 May 1911.

On 18 November 1994, the Shire of Euroa was abolished, and along with the Shires of Goulburn and Violet Town, and some neighbouring districts, was merged into the newly created Shire of Strathbogie. The Arcadia and Karramomus districts were transferred to newly created City of Greater Shepparton, whilst the Terip Terip district was transferred to the newly created Shire of Murrindindi.

Wards

The Shire of Euroa was divided into three ridings on 31 May 1975, each of which elected three councillors:
 Euroa Riding
 North Riding
 South Riding

Towns and localities
 Arcadia
 Balmattum
 Creightons Creek
 Euroa*
 Gooram
 Karramomus
 Kelvin View
 Kithbrook
 Miepoll
 Moglonemby
 Molka
 Sheans Creek
 Strathbogie

* Council seat.

Population

* Estimate in the 1958 Victorian Year Book.

References

External links
 Victorian Places - Euroa and Euroa Shire

Euroa
1879 establishments in Australia
1994 disestablishments in Australia
Euroa